Misery Harbour is a Norwegian drama by Nils Gaup.

The film received mixed reviews with "die throws" of 5 in VG, and Dagbladet; 4 in Adresseavisen and in Bergensavisen;.

Plot
A young writer named Espen Arnakke tells the story of his escape from the small Danish town of Jante. Espen boards a ship headed to Newfoundland, but the harsh conditions on board makes him jump ship, and he ends up in the little town of Misery Harbour. There he meets the girl of his dreams. But his passion shifts to jealousy when one of the men from the ship mysteriously appears in town, and sets out to make Espen's life a misery.

Cast

Nikolaj Coster-Waldau as Espen Arnakke
Stuart Graham as John Wakefield
Anneke Von Der Lippe as Jenny
Graham Greene as Burly
Bjørn Floberg as Johan Hoeg
Hywel Bennett as The Captain
Sturla Berg-Johansen as Waiter
Stig Hoffmeyer as Wilhelm Arnakke

References

Films directed by Nils Gaup
Norwegian drama films
1999 films